Hans Hahne (18 Mar 1875, Piesdorf–2 Feb 1935, Halle (Saale) ) was a German physician and prehistorian.

Life
Hans Hahne was born the son of a sugar manufacturer. He attended school in Artern and after 1885 in Berlin and Magdeburg, where he graduated in 1894 from the Domgymnasium. At the Universities of Jena, Munich, and Leipzig, he studied natural sciences and medicine and received his MD in 1899. This was followed by specialist training in Bern, Berlin, and Leipzig. In 1902 Hahne settled in Magdeburg as an internist and neurologist, but closed his practice in 1905 to devote himself to prehistory and early history .

In the years 1905-1907 Hahne studied prehistory under Gustaf Kossinna at the University of Berlin. From 1907 he became assistant at the Lower Saxony State Museum in Hannover, where he was appointed assistant director in 1908. At the same time he was an adjunct professor at the Leibniz University Hannover. In 1912 Hahne was appointed director of the Halle State Museum of Prehistory. In World War I he was exempted from military service due to a heart and liver disease. At the University of Halle, he received his doctorate in February 1918 with his thesis "Die geologische Lagerung der Moorleichen und Moorbrücken als Beitrag zur Forschung der erdgeschichtlichen Vorgänge der Nacheiszeit " ("The geological stratification of bog bodies and bog villages as a contribution to the research of geological processes of the post-glacial period"). He was appointed professor in May and habilitated in November 1918 at the University of Hannover in prehistory (Prehistoric Archeology). In 1921 Hahne was appointed associate professor, in November 1933 full professor; shortly afterwards he was appointed rector of the University of Halle. As a "Volkish" scientist, he also incorporated anthroposophical influences into his theories. Before 1933 Hahne joined the National Socialist Party and was Deputy District Culture Warden (Gaukulturwart), Director of Training in Racial Science (Rassenkunde) in Gau Mitteldeutschland (Saxony) of the SS Race and Settlement Main Office (Rasse- und Siedlungshauptamt). In February 1934, Hahne suffered a severe stroke with paralysis on his left side, which hindered him so much that he had to turn over most of his duties to colleagues.

Hans Hahne died on 2 February 1935  in Halle.

Hahne's research interests were bog archeology and bog bodies, such as the "Bernuthsfeld Man".

References

 
 
 
 
 

1875 births
1935 deaths
People from the Province of Saxony
Archaeologists from Saxony-Anhalt
Prehistorians
Leipzig University alumni